The Bursa Metropolitan Municipality Stadium is a stadium in Bursa, Turkey. It has a capacity of 43,761 spectators and is home to Bursaspor of the TFF Second League. The venue has a large crocodile's mouth.

External links
Timsah Arena at StadiumDB.com

References

Football venues in Turkey
Sport in Bursa
Sports venues completed in 2015
2015 establishments in Turkey